Dasht Bal (also Romanized as Dasht Bāl and Dasht-e Bāl; also known as Dashtibāl) is a village in Khafrak-e Olya Rural District, Seyyedan District, Marvdasht County, Fars Province, Iran. At the 2006 census, its population was 510, in 125 families.

References 

Populated places in Marvdasht County